is a retired Japanese professional shogi player who achieved the rank of 9-dan. He is one of the strongest shogi players of the Shōwa period (1926–1989) and holds the titles of Lifetime Kisei, Lifetime Meijin, Lifetime Ōi, and Lifetime Ōza.

Nakahara served as the president of the Japan Shogi Association from May 2003 until May 2005. He retired from professional shogi in March 2009 at age 61 due to health reasons.

Nakahara castle
Nakahara won the Kōzō Masuda Award in 1996 for developing the "Nakahara castle" (中原囲い) as a counter strategy to the Side Pawn Capture opening.

Major titles and other championships
Nakahara appeared in 91 major title matches and won 64 major titles during his career. He won the Kisei title sixteen times, the Meijin title fifteen times, the  eleven times, the Ōi title eight times, the Osho title seven times, Oza title six times, and the Kioh title once. He holds the titles of Lifetime Kisei, Lifetime Meijin, Lifetime Ōi, and Lifetime Ōza.

In addition to major titles, Nakahara won 28 other shogi championships throughout his career.

Major titles

Note: Tournaments marked with an asterisk (*) are no longer held.

Notes

References

External links
ShogiHub: Professional Player Info · Nakahara, Makoto

Japanese shogi players
Living people
Retired professional shogi players
Recipients of the Medal with Purple Ribbon
Professional shogi players from Miyagi Prefecture
1947 births
Meijin (shogi)
Tenth Dan
Kisei (shogi)
Ōi (shogi)
Ōza (shogi)
Kiō
Ōshō
Lifetime titles
Recipients of the Kōzō Masuda Award
Presidents of the Japan Shogi Association